Joe Stephens (born January 28, 1973) is an American former professional basketball player and currently serves as an elected Justice of the Peace for Harris County Precinct 3, Place 1 in Harris County, Texas. He had a brief career in the NBA in the late 1990s and a 6-year pro basketball career in Europe.

A 6'7", 210 lb. small forward born in Riverside, California, Stephens played collegiately at the University of Arkansas at Little Rock and at the University of Colorado.

After playing professionally in Argentina, Stephens signed a 10-day contract with the Houston Rockets in 1997.  He played parts of 2 seasons with the Houston Rockets He also played with the Vancouver Grizzlies in 1999, and had a brief stint with the Utah Jazz of the NBA.

He is well known is his community and has had a tremendous impact on local youth through advocacy and mentorship.  He now owns an insurance agency in his hometown of Houston, TX and was elected to the Galena Park ISD School Board of Trustees in 2009.  In early 2015 he was honored with a PTA lifetime achievement award and also serves as a board member for the North Channel Chamber of Commerce.  He serves on numerous boards and community organizations and can often be found serving his community with his fellow Rotarians.

References

External links
NBA stats
 http://www.bizjournals.com/houston/stories/2007/07/09/story6.html?page=all

1973 births
Living people
African-American basketball players
American expatriate basketball people in Argentina
American expatriate basketball people in Canada
American expatriate basketball people in the Philippines
American men's basketball players
Basketball players from Riverside, California
Colorado Buffaloes men's basketball players
Houston Rockets players
Kawasaki Brave Thunders players
La Crosse Bobcats players
Little Rock Trojans men's basketball players
Magnolia Hotshots players
Philippine Basketball Association imports
Small forwards
Undrafted National Basketball Association players
Vancouver Grizzlies players
21st-century African-American sportspeople
20th-century African-American sportspeople